Lycée Français International Marcel Pagnol is a French traditional school in Asunción, Paraguay. The school serves levels maternelle through lycée (senior high school).

See also

List of high schools in Paraguay

References

External links
  Lycée Français International Marcel Pagnol
   Lycée Français International Marcel Pagnol
 collège français Marcel Pagnol d'Asunción (Archive)
 collège français Marcel Pagnol d'Asunción (Archive)

Schools in Asunción
Asuncion
Marcel Pagnol